The R559 is a Regional Route in Gauteng, South Africa that connects Protea Glen with Carletonville via Randfontein.

Route
The R559 begins at a junction with the R558 Road in Protea Glen, Soweto, just north of the R558's intersection with the N12. It goes north-west for 17 kilometres to reach a junction with the R28 Road in the southern suburbs of Randfontein.

From Randfontein, it turns to the south-west and goes for 22 kilometres to reach a junction with Station Street. It becomes Station Street westwards and goes for 17 kilometres to enter the towns of Oberholzer and Carletonville. It reaches a junction with the R500 Road and bypasses Carletonville Mall. From the R500 junction, it goes westwards for 18 kilometres, forming the southern border of Khutsong, to reach its western terminus at a junction with the R501 Road.

References

Regional Routes in Gauteng